In organic chemistry, a diazapentalene is any of the heterocyclic compounds having molecular formula C6H6N2 whose structure is two fused two pentagonal rings of six carbon atoms and two nitrogen atoms. That is, it is a heteropentalene, with two nitrogens substituted in for carbons. There are several different constitutional isomers. Each diazapentalene has 10 pi electrons and shows aromaticity. Some of the diazapentalenes are mesomeric betaines, however these diazapentalenes are not mesoionic.

See also 
pentalene
Diketopyrrolopyrrole dye(:de:Diketopyrrolopyrrol-Pigmente)

References 

Heterocyclic compounds with 2 rings
Simple aromatic rings
Nitrogen heterocycles